MTV Grind Volume 1, although called Volume 1, was the only album released for the MTV Grind series.

Track listing
Virtual Insanity (Peace of Mind Mix) - Jamiroquai
It's No Good – Depeche Mode
Your Woman – Whitetown
Wannabe – Spice Girls
Runaway (Original Flava 12" Mix) – Nuyorican Soul
Free (Mood II Swing Mix) – Ultra Nate
Fired Up! (Club 69 Remix) – Funky Green Dogs
A Little Bit of Ecstasy (Cibola Remix) – Jocelyn Enriquez
Spin Spin Sugar (Armand's Dark Garage Mix) – Sneaker Pimps
Stupid Girl (Tee's Freeze Clubmix) – Garbage
One More Night (Hani Remix) – Amber
Ooh Aah... Just a Little Bit (Motiv 8 Edit) – Gina G
Samba de Janeiro (U.S Edit) - Felizia
Sugar is Sweeter (Armand's Drum & Bass Mix) - CJ Bolland
Nightmare (Club 69 Remix) - Brainbug

MTV series albums
1997 compilation albums
Tommy Boy Records compilation albums
Dance-pop compilation albums